J. and E. Ledger is an engineering company based in Perth, Western Australia.

In its early years it was known as Ironfounders, Ironworkers and Tinsmiths.

In the 1890s the firm had a factory in William Street.

The firm had a foundry utilised for materials for the Goldfields Water Supply Scheme.

In 1929 it was located at a premises in 231 Pier Street.

In the 1960s the company name had changed to Ledger Engineering.

References

Companies based in Perth, Western Australia
Pier Street, Perth